The black limbless skink (Melanoseps ater) is an extant species of skink, a lizard in the family Scincidae. The species is found in Mozambique, Malawi, Zambia, Kenya, Tanzania, and Democratic Republic of the Congo.

References

Melanoseps
Reptiles described in 1873
Taxa named by Albert Günther